Princely Brewery Tychy (Polish Tyskie Browary Książęce) or Tychy Brewery in the town of Tychy is one of the largest breweries in Poland. It is operated by the Kompania Piwowarska company. It traces its history to the 17th century.

The brand of beer produced by the brewery is Tyskie.

Today, the premises host a beer museum "Tyskie Brewing Museum" (Polish Tyskie Browarium).

During a 2009 vote the brewery complex was voted as one of the "Seven Architectural Wonders of the Silesian Voivodeship."

References

External links
Tyskie Brewery museum homepage (English)

Buildings and structures in Tychy
Breweries of Poland